The year 1961 in architecture involved some significant architectural events and new buildings.

Events
 December - Demolition of the Euston Arch in London begins.
 Archigram is founded as an avant-garde architectural group based at the Architectural Association, London, and publishes its manifesto Archigram I. It will work through hypothetical projects and an associated magazine.
 Ahrends, Burton and Koralek is formed as an architectural practice in London.
 Building Design Partnership is formed in Preston, Lancashire.
 St Eusebius' Church, Arnhem, Netherlands, is restored by Berend Tobia Boeyinga.
 The first apartment blocks in Hungary of Panelház (large panel building) construction are erected in Dunaújváros.
 Construction of Jatiyo Sangsad Bhaban (house of the national parliament of Bangladesh) in Dhaka, designed by Louis Kahn, begins.
 Double tee beams are first used by Gene Leedy in constructing his own office at Winter Haven, Florida.

Buildings and structures

Buildings opened

February 6 - Olin Library at Cornell University, designed by Warner, Burns, Toan & Lunde, opens.
March 11 - Benton Park School, Leeds, England, designed by Sir John Burnet, Tait and Partners, formally opened.
May 17 - Guildford Cathedral, England, designed by Sir Edward Maufe, dedicated.
May 18 - The Henninger Turm in Frankfurt, Germany, designed by Karl Leiser, inaugurated.
September 17 - The Civic Arena, Pittsburgh, United States, designed by Mitchell and Ritchey, is completed (demolished 2011-2012).
October 17 - The Kremlin Palace of Congresses in Moscow, Soviet Union, designed by a team led by M. Posokhin.
November 20 - Dungeness Lighthouse on the south coast of England, designed by Philip W. Hunt (engineer) and Ronald Ward and Partners (architects), illuminated.
December 17 - New Kaiser Wilhelm Memorial Church (Gedächtniskirche) in Berlin, designed by Egon Eiermann, consecrated.
date unknown -  Rose Art Museum in Waltham, Massachusetts, designed by Harrison & Abramovitz.

Buildings completed

December 8 - The Space Needle in Seattle, Washington, United States, designed by Edward Carlson, John Graham and Victor Steinbrueck.
date unknown
Hyvinkää Church in Hyvinkää, Finland, designed by Aarno Ruusuvuori.
The Palazzo del Lavoro and Palazzetto dello sport in Turin, designed by Pier Luigi Nervi.
One Chase Manhattan Plaza in New York City, United States, designed by Gordon Bunshaft of Skidmore, Owings and Merrill.
The Empress State Building in London, England, designed by Stone, Toms & Partners.
Brasenose College, Oxford, England, Staircases 16, 17 and 18, designed by Powell and Moya.
Lady Margaret Hall, Oxford, England, Wolfson Quadrangle library and entrance, designed by Raymond Erith.
Yokohama Marine Tower in Yokohama, Japan.
Chungking Mansions in Hong Kong, China.
Park Hill Flats, Sheffield, England, designed by Jack Lynn and Ivor Smith.
Keelson (house for Olga Kennard), Hills Avenue, Cambridge, England, designed by Danish architect Eric Sørensen.
Embassy of the United States, Baghdad, Iraq, designed by Josep Lluís Sert, is completed (abandoned 1990).
Michael Faraday Memorial at Elephant and Castle in London, designed by Rodney Gordon.
Service station with hyperbolic paraboloid concrete shell roof at Markham Moor, Nottinghamshire, England, designed by Sam Scorer.

Publications
Jane Jacobs - The Death and Life of Great American Cities
Lewis Mumford - The City in History 
Gordon Cullen - The Concise Townscape

Awards
AIA Gold Medal - Le Corbusier.
RAIA Gold Medal - Louis Laybourne-Smith.
RIBA Royal Gold Medal - Lewis Mumford.
Rome Prize - Max Abramovitz

Births
July - Simon Allford, English architect
November 18 - Dietmar Feichtinger, Austrian architect based in Paris
Patrik Schumacher, German-born architect

Deaths
January 5 - Yehuda Magidovitch, Israeli architect (born 1886)
July 18 - Olaf Andreas Gulbransson, German architect (born 1916)
September 1 - Eero Saarinen, Finnish architect and industrial designer (born 1910)
September 16 - Walter Godfrey, English architectural historian and architect (born 1881)
October 19 - Jan Buijs, Dutch architect (born 1889)
December 13 - Henry Hornbostel, American architect and educator (born 1867)

References

 
20th-century architecture